William of Zardana, also known as William of Saone (died in 1132 or 1133), was a powerful baron who held Balatanos, Saone and Zardana in the Principality of Antioch. After his father, Robert the Leper, was executed by the atabeg (or governor) of Toghtekin in 1119, William inherited Balatanos and Saone. Zardana, that his father had lost before his death, was restored to William by Baldwin II of Jerusalem in 1121. He supported Baldwin II's daughter, Alice, against her brother-in-law, Fulk of Jerusalem, in 1132, but Fulk defeated her allies. William died fighting either against Fulk's troops or against a Muslim army.

Family 

William was the son of Robert the Leper, who held important fiefs in the Principality of Antioch. Two of Robert's three castlesSaone and Balatanoswere located near Latakia, the third, Zardana, to the east of the Orontes River. Zardana was taken by Toghtekin, atabeg of Damascus, in 1119. Robert was captured during the siege and Toghtekin had him executed. William and his brother, Garenton, inherited their father's domains. Saone was strengthened during either his or his father's tenure.

Antiochene baron 

King Baldwin II of Jerusalem ruled Antioch on behalf of the minor prince, Bohemond II, from 1119. Historian Thomas Asbridge says, William may have been one of the barons who persuaded the king to pursue an aggressive policy against the Muslims of Aleppo. Indeed, the 13th-century historian, Ibn al-Adim, mentioned that Baldwin II laid siege to Zardana "for William" in 1121. Zardana surrendered to Baldwin who restored the fortress to William. A year later, the Artuqid rulers, Ilghazi and Balak, jointly attacked Zardana. William defended the fortress for fifteen days before he surrendered it, but he soon routed Ilghazi at Harbal. Due to his proximity to Aleppo, Zardana was one of the strategically most important fortresses in the principality.

Bohemond II assumed the government of Antioch in 1126, but died four years later. His widow, Alice, wanted to secure the rule of Antioch for herself against her brother-in-law, Fulk of Jerusalem, in 1132. William and his brother supported her, but Fulk defeated her allies and appointed Rainald I Masoir to administer the principality. William died during either this conflict or a Muslim attack against Zardana. His widow, Beatrice, married Joscelin II of Courtenay.

References

Sources 

 
 
 
 

1130s deaths
Nobility of the Principality of Antioch
Military personnel killed in action